The white-throated laughingthrush (Pterorhinus albogularis) is a species of passerine bird in the family Leiothrichidae. It is found mainly in the northern regions of the Indian subcontinent, primarily the Himalayas, and some adjoining and disjunct areas.  It ranges across Afghanistan, Bhutan, India, Myanmar, Nepal, Tibet and Vietnam. Its natural habitat is subtropical or tropical moist montane forests.

This species was formerly placed in the genus Garrulax but following the publication of a comprehensive molecular phylogenetic study in 2018, it was moved to the resurrected genus Pterorhinus.

Gallery

References

External links
 White-throated laughingthrush video on the Internet Bird Collection

white-throated laughingthrush
Birds of China
Birds of the Himalayas
Birds of Yunnan
white-throated laughingthrush
Taxonomy articles created by Polbot
Taxobox binomials not recognized by IUCN